CKBC-FM (Bounce 104.9) is a Canadian radio station broadcasting in Bathurst, New Brunswick at 104.9 MHz with an effective radiated power of 33,500 watts. The station has been broadcasting since April 18, 1955.

The station is currently owned by Bell Media.

History
In 1954, Bathurst Broadcasting Co. Ltd. received approval to operate an English and French-language AM station with a power of 250 watts. CKBC was originally broadcast on 1400 kHz, and by 1966, had moved to 1360 kHz. The station increased power from 250 to 10,000 watts. Over the years, CKBC went through a number of ownerships. In 2002, CKBC and Telemedia Radio Atlantic's other radio stations were purchased by Astral Media. 
On November 14, 2003, CKBC was given approval to switch to the FM band.

On June 27, 2013, the CRTC approved an application by Astral Media Inc. to sell its pay and specialty television channels, conventional television stations and radio stations to BCE Inc., including CKBC-FM.

As part of a mass format reorganization by Bell Media, on May 18, 2021, CKBC flipped to adult hits, and adopted the Bounce branding.

Former logo

References

External links
 Bounce 104.9
 
 

Mass media in Bathurst, New Brunswick
Kbc
Kbc
Radio stations established in 1955
1955 establishments in New Brunswick